Waterford is a civil parish in Kings County, New Brunswick, Canada.

For governance purposes it forms the local service district of the parish of Waterford, which is a member of Regional Service Commission 8 (RSC8).

The community of Waterford has an active outdoor ice rink (Waterford Youth Centre) as well as a Community Hall that hold events such as paint nights, Thanksgiving and Christmas dinners, Easter parties and more. The area is known for its Skiing and Mountain Biking at Poley Mountain Resorts, hunting, fishing ATVing and other outdoor activities. Some local hotspots include: Friars Nose, Trout Creek Falls, Waterford Falls, Adairs Wilderness Lodge, Parlee Brook Amphitheatre Trail, Urney Covered Bridge and the Moores Mill Covered Bridge.

Origin of name
The parish was said locally to be named by Mr. A. McAfee, an Irish immigrant, for Waterford, Ireland.

History
Waterford was erected in 1874 from Sussex Parish.

In 1875 the boundary with Hammond Parish was altered.

Boundaries
Waterford Parish is bounded:

 on the north by a line beginning on the Sussex Parish line at a point southeast of DeCourcey Lake and about 1.4 kilometres north-northwest of Trout Creek, then running east-northeasterly along the southern line of grants straddling Picadilly Road until it reaches the northeastern corner of a grant to David Law on the southern side of Law Road, then east-southeasterly to the northwestern line of a grant to Thomas Nicholson, on the eastern side of Morton Road west-southwesterly of Mechanic Lake, then east-northeasterly along the northern line of the Nicholson grant and its prolongation to the Albert County line;
 on the east by the Albert County line;
 on the south by a line beginning on the Albert County line at a point about 1.65 kilometres south-southeast from Route 114, then running north 88º west to the northeastern corner of a grant to William Thompson, about 450 metres south of the southern tip of Walton Lake and about 150 metres west of the Creek Road, then westerly to a point about 825 metres north of the western end of Cassidy Lake in Upham Parish;
 on the west by a line running south from the mouth of Halfway Brook in Studholm Parish.

Communities
Communities at least partly within the parish. italics indicate a name no longer in official use

 Cedar Camp
 Chambers Settlement
 Donegal
 Long Settlement

 Parlee Brook
 Urney
 Walker Settlement
 Waterford

Bodies of water
Bodies of water at least partly in the parish.

 Point Wolfe River
 Trout Creek
 Flood Lake
 Hamilton Lake
 Lair Lake

 Mechanic Lake
 Pleasant Lake
 Victor Lake
 Walton Lake
 Wolfe Lake

Other notable places
Parks, historic sites, and other noteworthy places at least partly in the parish.
 Fundy National Park
 McManus Hill Protected Natural Area
 Poley Mountain

Demographics

Population
Population trend

Language
Mother tongue language (2016)

Access Routes
Highways and numbered routes that run through the parish, including external routes that start or finish at the parish limits:

Highways

Notable people
Bessie Ella Hazen, painter, born in Waterford

See also
List of parishes in New Brunswick

Notes

References

Local service districts of Kings County, New Brunswick
Parishes of Kings County, New Brunswick